The W.A. Heritage Trails Network is a network of heritage trails and places in Western Australia that was initially funded by the Australian Commonwealth/State Bicentennial Commemorative Program for the 1988 Australian Bicentenary. In many cases local communities and councils collaborated with the National Trust of Australia (WA) to research and develop local trails.

The production of signage and literature for the 1988 celebrations set significant standards for heritage identification for the state of Western Australia.

The network was overseen by the W.A. Heritage Committee at the time; the committee became the Heritage Council of Western Australia.

The trails included walk trails, and others that spanned distances requiring a vehicle to traverse.

The trails were grouped into regions - South Metropolitan and North Metropolitan in Perth, Midlands (including parts of the Wheatbelt region), South West and other regions of Western Australia.

Trails
 Albany Heritage Trail - titled First settlement Heritage Trail
 Arthur Head Heritage Trail (Fremantle)
 Augusta-Busselton Heritage Trail
 Broome Heritage Trail
 Guildford to York Heritage Trail
 Moora Heritage Trail
 New Norcia Heritage Trail
 Perth 
 Central Perth Heritage Trail
 East Perth Heritage Trail
 Northbridge Heritage Trail
 West Perth Heritage Trail
 South coast Heritage Trail
 Subiaco Heritage Trail
 Swan River Heritage Trail
 Swan Valley Heritage Trail
 Toodyay Pioneer Heritage Trail
 Yarloop Heritage Trail
 York Heritage Trail
 York to Goldfields Heritage Trail

See also
 List of heritage buildings in Perth, Western Australia

References

1988 establishments in Australia
Heritage trails in Western Australia
Australian bicentennial commemorations